Treene may refer to:

 Treene (Amt), an Amt in Schleswig-Holstein, Germany
 Treene (river), in Schleswig-Holstein, Germany

See also
 Treen (disambiguation)